Hydro is a smartphone designed and manufactured by Kyocera. The Hydro features Android 4.0 and 3.5" IPS panel touchscreen. Hydro is one of the first waterproof smartphones, certified for IPX5 & IPX7.

Other specs include Wi-Fi hotspot, and 3.2 MP (2048×1536 px) camera with geotagging.

Media formats supported: Audio: AAC, AAC+, eAAC+, AMR-NB, AMR-WB, MP3, MIDI, Vorbis. Video: MPEG4, H.263, H.264.

Kyocera Hydro series
 Hydro
 Hydro Edge
 Hydro Icon
 Hydro Life
 Hydro wave

See also
 List of Android devices
 Smartphone

References

Android (operating system) devices
Kyocera mobile phones